The Central Theater Command is one of the five theater commands of the People's Liberation Army of China, and was founded on 1 February 2016. Its predecessors were the Beijing Military Region and Jinan Military Region.

The International Institute for Strategic Studies attributes to the command of 300,000 personnel, consisting of three group armies 81st Group Army, 82nd Group Army, 83rd Group Army (Formerly 27th Army, 38th Army, and the 65th Army), two armoured divisions, one mechanised infantry division, five motorised divisions, one artillery division, three armoured, seven motorised infantry, four artillery, a total of five various anti-aircraft brigades, and one anti-tank regiment.

In addition to guarding the capital, the CTC is the main military theater command in charge of training key personnel for leadership positions through the numerous military academies in the region.

Area of responsibility 
The Central Theater Command's area of responsibility (AOR) consists of the previous Beijing Military Region, including the capital Beijing and the neighboring provinces and directly governed municipalities of Tianjin, Hebei, Shaanxi, Shanxi, Henan and Hubei.

The command's primary responsibility is the defense of the nation's capital, Beijing, and it serves as the national strategic military reserve.

Commanders
Han Weiguo (January 2016 – August 2017)
Yi Xiaoguang (August 2017 – August 2021)
Lin Xiangyang (August 2021 – January 2022)
Wu Yanan (January 2022 – January 2023)
Huang Ming (January 2023 – present)

PLA Ground Forces

Regiments/Units

81st Group Army
 7th Heavy Combined Arms Brigade
 70th Light Combined Arms Brigade, located in Tangshan Prefecture, Hebei Province
 162nd Motorized Infantry Division, located in  Anyang Prefecture, Henan Province
 189th Medium Combined Arms Brigade
 194th Combined Arms Brigade
 195th Heavy Combined Arms Brigade, located in Yutian County, Hebei Province

82nd Group Army
 6th Heavy Combined Arms Brigade, located in Nankou Town Area, Changping District, Beijing
 80th Medium Combined Arms Brigade
 127th Light Mechanized Infantry Division (a.k.a. the Red Army Division), located in Luoyang Prefecture, Henan Province
 151st Heavy Combined Arms Brigade
 188th Heavy Combined Arms Brigade
 196th Light Combined Arms Brigade

83rd Group Army
 11th Heavy Combined Arms Brigade
 58th Medium Combined Arms Brigade, located in Xuchang Prefecture, Henan Province
 60th Medium Combined Arms Brigade, located in Minggang Town Area, Xinyang Prefecture, Henan Province
 113th Combined Arms Brigade, located in Baoding Prefecture, Hebei Province
 131st Combined Arms Brigade
 193rd Medium Combined Arms Brigade, located in Xuanhua District, Zhangjiakou Prefecture, Hebei Province

PLA Beijing Garrison 
1st Guard Division , located in Haidian, Beijing
3rd Guard Regiment (Heavy Infantry) 
4th Guard Regiment (Light Quick reaction force) 
5th Guard Regiment (Light Quick reaction force) 
Central Guard Regiment
Honor Guard Battalion 
3rd Guard Division, located in Tongzhou, Beijing
11th Guards Regiment (showcase unit)
13th Guards Regiment (special security unit)
Armored Regiment
Artillery Regiment
Anti-Aircraft Artillery Regiment
Support Battalion 
17th Guard Regiment
Reserve Unit
Reserve Officer Training Corps
Reserve Artillery Division, located in Huairou, Beijing
Reserve Chemical Defense Regiment, located in Xicheng, Beijing

See also 
 Central Theater Command Ground Force
 Central Theater Command Air Force

References 

 
Theater commands of the People's Liberation Army
Military units and formations established in 2016
2016 establishments in China
Military of Beijing
Military of Tianjin